The article lists all the urban local bodies, covering municipal corporations, municipalities and nagar panchayats in the Indian state of Andhra Pradesh. The statistical data is based on Directorate of Town and Country Planning, Government of Andhra Pradesh. The state of Andhra Pradesh with 26 districts has a total of 125 urban local bodies. It includes, 17 municipal corporations, 79 
municipalities and 30 nagar panchayats.

 According available data, Bheemunipatnam is oldest municipality in Andhra Pradesh and second oldest municipality in India after Chennapatnam [ Chennai ]. Now, Bheemunipatnam is a part of GVMC and Adoni in Kurnool district is the oldest municipality in Rayalaseema region, followed by Kurnool.

The hierarchy in Municipal Body

 Municipal Corporation
 Municipality 
 Selection Grade Municipality
 Special Grade Municipality
 Grade - 1 Municipality
 Grade - 2 Municipality
 Grade - 3 Municipality 
 Nagar Panchayat
 Grama Panchayat

Municipal corporations 

The state of Andhra Pradesh has a total of 17 municipal corporations in 26 districts. Guntur district has the most corporations with two and all the other districts have one each. GVMC is the largest municipal corporation with greater status. Out of 17 corporations, 16 are district headquarters, except Mangalagiri-Tadepalli.

Note:
 Machilipatnam, Srikakulam and Vizianagaram were upgraded as municipal corporations on 9 December 2015. 

In March 2021 former municipalities Mangalagiri Municipality and Tadepalli Municipality  of Guntur district were merged to form Mangalagiri Tadepalle Municipal Corporation.

Source: Statistical Information of ULBs and UDAs

Municipalities 

Municipalities in the state of Andhra Pradesh are categorised into 5 types. They are in the following hierarchy

Selection Grade Municipality- 8
Special Grade Municipality- 8
Grade - 1 Municipality- 15
Grade - 2 Municipality- 30
Grade - 3 Municipality- 18

Guntur district has the most municipalities with 12.

Source: Statistical Information of ULBs and UDAs

Nagar panchayats 
The state of Andhra Pradesh has a total of 30 nagar panchayats.

Prakasam district has the most nagar panchayats of four.

Municipalities formation year 
source of website is placed at the bottom of table.

Above 28 are the municipalities formed before Independence.

In 2005 Government of Andhra Pradesh have upgraded 12 areas as municipalities.

In 2011 Government of Andhra Pradesh have upgraded 21 areas as municipalities.

In 2012, 6 more Towns were upgraded as Municipal Bodies

In 2020 Government of Andhra Pradesh has upgraded 10 areas as Municipal Bodies

In 2021 Government of Andhra Pradesh has created 1 Municipal Corporation and 1 Municipality.

Source of Formation Year

http://dtcp.ap.gov.in/dtcpweb/ulbs/List%20of%20ULBs-27-2-2019.pdf

http://dtcp.ap.gov.in/dtcpweb/ULBS.html

Source:

Directorate of town and country planning website.

See also 
List of municipal corporations in Andhra Pradesh

References 

Lists of populated places in Andhra Pradesh
Andhra Pradesh-related lists
Andhra Pradesh, Urban local bodies